Bain-de-Bretagne (Gallo: Bóen) is a commune in the Ille-et-Vilaine department in Brittany in northwestern France.

Geography
The river Semnon forms part of the commune's northern boundary.

Population

Inhabitants of Bain-de-Bretagne are called Bainais in French.

See also 
Tombe à la fille
Communes of the Ille-et-Vilaine department

References

External links

Official website 

Mayors of Ille-et-Vilaine Association 

Communes of Ille-et-Vilaine